Muhammad Qasim (born 1 May 1984) is a retired Pakistani professional footballer who played for Khan Research Laboratories throughout his professional career as a right-winger. He has also represented Pakistan on international level.

Qasim has won league title with Khan Research Laboratories for four times, winning his first league title in 2009-10. Qasim won further three back to back league titles in 2010-11, 2011-12 and 2012-13. Qasim has also won National Football Challenge Cup with KRL on six occasions including four back to back cup wins from 2009, 2010, 2011 and 2012. He won the two more cups in 2015 and 2016. 
Qasim also won Geo Super Football League with Islamabad United in its inaugural season.

Early career

Ravi FC and Islamabad United
Qasim started his footballing career with Ravi FC Islamabad before joining Islamabad United for the Geo Super Football League. Qasim won the inaugural season of Geo Super League, scoring 3 goals in 6 appearances.

KRL F.C.

2007-10: Debut year, injuries & first league title
Qasim joined Khan Research Laboratories after conclusion of Geo Super League. He played his first national league game in 2007-08, where he ended the season on third position with KRL and scored 9 goals in 18 appearances.

Qasim missed the 2008-09 season due to a knee-injury.

Qasim along with Khan Research Laboratories won their first ever league in 2009-10 after drawing 0-0 with Army on the final day of the league. Both teams ended on 60 points each, with Khan Research Laboratories winning the league on goal differences.

2010–2011: Vice captaincy
Qasim was made club's vice-captain in the 2010-11 season. Qasim started his and KRL's season with a 2-0 victory against PAF, Qasim scored the opening goal in 37th minute. On 3 October 2010, Qasim scored his second goal of the season in the 6th minute, as KRL defeated Navy 2-0 in the game. Qasim netted his first hat-trick of the season in a 4-0 thumping of PEL scoring goals in 23rd, 33rd and 52nd minutes of the game, it marked as his ninth hat-trick of the career. On 3 December 2010, Qasim scored the only goal of the game against Afghan in the ninth minute. KRL defeated SSGC 3-0 with Qasim scoring second goal for the club in 54th after the left-winger Mehmood Khan broke the offside trap to assist the goal for him. On 12 December 2010, KRL defeated NBP 2-0 as Qasim scored goals in each half, scoring in 18th and 81st minutes respectively.
Qasim ended the season as the top-scorer of KRL, scoring 11 goals in 30 games as KRL finished second in the table.

International career
He earned his first international cap by head coach Akhtar Mohiuddin against Iraq in the 2010 World Cup qualifiers, a game which Pakistan famously drew 0-0 in Damascus, Syria with Qasim's strong running and work-rate giving a strong impression for the coaching staff and fans alike.

His first goal came in a friendly against Nepal at Pokhara on March 27, 2008 which Pakistan won 2-0 after a long run from his own half before a powerful shot that beat the Nepalese keeper. Qasim later scored an international hat-trick in the 9-2 record win against Guam in the 2008 AFC Challenge Cup qualifiers.

International

Goals for Senior National Team

Honours
Islamabad United
Geo Super Football League: 2007

Khan Research Laboratories
Pakistan Premier League: 2009–10, 2011–12, 2012–13, 2013–14
National Challenge Cup: 2009, 2010, 2011, 2012, 2015, 2016

References

1984 births
Living people
Pakistani footballers
Pakistan international footballers
Association football forwards
Association football midfielders
Khan Research Laboratories F.C. players